Ford Hall may refer to:
Ford Hall Forum, the oldest free public lecture series in the United States.
Ford Hall, located on the campus of Berry College.
Ford Hall, located on the campus of Brandeis University.
Ford Hall, a chapel in Derbyshire, United Kingdom.
Ford Hall, located on the campus of Eastern Illinois University.
Ford Hall, located on the campus of Eastern Michigan University which serves as a gallery and administration building.
Ford Hall, Ice District, Edmonton, Alberta, Canada
Ford Hall, located on the campus of Ithaca College.
Ford Hall (Kansas State University), an all-female residence hall at Kansas State University.
Ford Hall, located on the campus of the University of Louisville.
Ford Hall, located on the campus of Northwest Nazarene University.
Ford Hall, located on the campus of the University of Minnesota.
Ford Hall, located on the campus of Rutgers University.
Ford Hall, located on the campus of Smith College.
Ford Hall, located on the campus of Suffolk University.
Ford Hall, located on the campus of SUNY Oneonta.
Ford Hall (Willamette University), located on the campus of Willamette University in Oregon.
Ford Hall, located on the campus of Williston Northampton School.

Architectural disambiguation pages